Medeis is the second studio album by Polish heavy metal band Hunter. It was released on March 7, 2003 by Rubicon/Pomaton EMI.

A music videos have been made for the songs "Kiedy umieram" and "Fallen" both directed by Marcin Klinger.

Track listing

Credits

References 

2003 albums
Polish-language albums
Hunter (band) albums